Cieśla is an occupational surname derived from the Polish word for the occupation of carpentry. It may refer to:
 Andrew R. Ciesla (born 1953), American politician
 Claudia Ciesla (born 1987), Polish-German actress
 Hank Ciesla (1934–1976), Canadian ice hockey player
 Maciej Cieśla (born 1988), Polish painter
 Maciej Szymon Cieśla (1989–2016), Polish digital artist
 Michał Cieśla (born 1981), Polish basketball player
 Piotr Cieśla (born 1955), Polish handball player

See also
 

Polish-language surnames
Occupational surnames